Flavio Oscar Cianciarulo (born July 26, 1964),  Sr. Flavio, is the electric and upright bass player from the reunited Argentine band Los Fabulosos Cadillacs and Latin American supergroup De La Tierra.

Sr. Flavio (as called by fans and members) has been the bass player from the beginning of the band when they were called Cadillac 57. He also sang many of the songs, and was one of the main songwriters of the band along with singer Vicentico.

After the unofficial separation of the band Sr. Flavio began a solo career, first with Flavio Calaveralma Trío and later with La Mandinga. He has also released a folklore and heavy metal album in collaboration with Ricardo Iorio and an album with Misterio, a band he formed with his son Ástor (drums) and Nico Valle (upright bass). In 2012 he joined Latin American groove metal quartet De La Tierra with members of Sepultura, A.N.I.M.A.L. and Maná. In 2017, Sr. Flavio along with his sons Ástor and Jay formed the death metal band Sotana and released their first album in 2018 called Secta del Acantilado.

Solo albums
 Flavio Solo, Viejo y Peludo (2001)
 Welcome to Terror Dance [EP] (2006)
 Nueva ola (2011)

Iorio-Flavio
 Peso Argento (1997)

Flavio Calaveralma Trío
 El marplatense (2003)

The Flavio Mandinga Project
 Cachivache (2004, as Flavio y la Mandinga)
 Sonidero (2005)
 Supersaund 2012 (2007)

Misterio
 Beat Zombie (2006)

References

External links
 

1964 births
Living people
Argentine musicians
Latin Grammy Award winners
21st-century double-bassists
De La Tierra members
Latin music songwriters